Koritno is a settlement on the right bank of the Dravinja River west of Breg in the Municipality of Majšperk in northeastern Slovenia. The area is part of the traditional region of Styria. It is now included with the rest of the municipality in the Drava Statistical Region.

References

External links
Koritno at Geopedia

Populated places in the Municipality of Majšperk